Jimmy Lefa Kauleza (born 16 September 1977) is a South African footballer currently playing as a striker for Bay United. He previously played for Orlando Pirates, Jomo Cosmos and Free State Stars, and earned five caps for the South African national team in 2002, scoring one goal. He was born in Viljoenskroon, Free State

External links 

 
 Free State Player Profile

1977 births
South African soccer players
South Africa international soccer players
Living people
Jomo Cosmos F.C. players
Free State Stars F.C. players
Orlando Pirates F.C. players
Association football forwards
Bay United F.C. players